The contralto singing voice has a vocal range that lies between the F below "middle C" (F3) to two Fs above middle C (F5) and is the lowest type of female voice.  In the lower and upper extremes, some contralto voices can sing from two Bs below middle C (B2) to two Bs above middle C (B5).

The term contralto was developed in relation to classical and operatic voices, where the classification is based not merely on the singer's vocal range but also on the tessitura and timbre of the voice. For classical and operatic singers, their voice type determines the roles they will sing and is a primary method of categorization. In classical music, a "pure" contralto is considered the rarest type of female voice. In non-classical music, singers are primarily defined by their genre and their gender, not their vocal range. When the terms soprano, mezzo-soprano, contralto, tenor, baritone, and bass are used as descriptors of non-classical voices, they are applied more loosely than they would be to those of classical singers and generally refer only to the singer's perceived vocal range. Contemporarily, the informal term alto is sometimes used interchangeably with contralto.

The following is a list of singers in country, popular music, jazz, and musical theatre who have been described as contraltos.

List of names

See also
 List of mezzo-sopranos in non-classical music
 List of sopranos in non-classical music
 List of basses in non-classical music
 List of baritones in non-classical music
 List of tenors in non-classical music
 List of operatic contraltos
 Voice classification in non-classical music
 Voice type

Notes

References

Works cited
 
 
 
 
 
 

Lists of singers
Lists of women in music